Amphibromus is a genus of grasses in the family Poaceae. Most are known as swamp wallaby grass. Most are endemic to Australia. One can also be found in New Zealand and there are two species in South America.

These are annual or perennial grasses. Some can have cleistogamous inflorescences sheathed on their stems. The open inflorescences may be spreading or spikelike. These may have some cleistogamous spikelets in them, as well.

Most species occur in moist to wet habitat types. Some tolerate periodic flooding well, even flowering in response to it.

 Species
 Amphibromus archeri - pointed swamp wallaby grass - South Australia, Tasmania, Victoria
 Amphibromus fluitans - river swamp wallaby grass, graceful swamp wallaby grass - Tasmania, Victoria, New South Wales, New Zealand (North + South Is)
 Amphibromus macrorhinus - long-nosed swamp wallaby grass - South Australia, Tasmania, Victoria, New South Wales, Western Australia
 Amphibromus neesii - southern swamp wallaby grass - Tasmania, Victoria, New South Wales; naturalized in California
 Amphibromus nervosus - common swamp wallaby grass, veined swamp wallaby grass - South Australia, Victoria, New South Wales, Western Australia
 Amphibromus pithogastrus - plump swamp wallaby grass - Victoria, New South Wales
 Amphibromus quadridentulus - Brazil (Rio Grande do Sul, Santa Catarina, Paraná, Rio de Janeiro, Minas Gerais), Argentina (Entre Ríos, Misiones), Uruguay
 Amphibromus recurvatus - dark swamp wallaby grass - South Australia, Tasmania, Victoria
 Amphibromus scabrivalvis - rough amphibromus - Bolivia (La Paz), Brazil, Argentina, Chile, Uruguay, Peru; naturalized in Louisiana
 Amphibromus sinuatus - wavy swamp wallaby grass - Tasmania, Victoria, New South Wales
 Amphibromus vickeryae - Western Australia
 †Amphibromus whitei small swamp wallaby grass - †Queensland but extinct

References

Pooideae
Poaceae genera
Poales of Australia
Grasses of South America